Blood Money is another Black Rain Entertainment release from Lord Infamous, T-Rock & II Tone. All of the songs feature Lord Infamous, T-Rock, and II Tone. "Love My Whip" featuring Chamillionaire was released as a single. A remix to this song was put on Lord's Futuristic Rowdy Bounty Hunter cd. The songs "Been Bout It" and "Niggas Like You" are also featured on the Rowdy Bounty Hunter cd. Nasty Nardo is featured on the newest version of "Been Bout It."

Track listing
Blood Money 4:23 
Niggas Like You 4:46
Love My Whip (featuring Chamillionaire) 4:36
Choppa Talk (featuring Mac Montese) 5:10
Ball Off (Remix) 4:46
Been Bout It 4:53
I Need Drugs 4:01
What You Bitches Wanna Do 4:31
Get It Crackin' 4:53
Show Up (featuring Mac Montese) 4:00
Workin' (featuring Scrilla Man, Suga, & Mac Montese) 4:31 
1-900 4:33
Do Dis 5:06
No Problems (featuring Mac Montese, Big Cheese, & C-Mob) 4:57
Crunk N Throwed 3:50
The Streets (Remix) (featuring Mac Montese & Flo Dawgs) 4:33

2009 albums
Lord Infamous albums